is a Japanese former professional baseball infielder in Japan's Nippon Professional Baseball. He played for the Fukuoka SoftBank Hawks from 2006 to 2009 and from 2012 to 2016 and with the Orix Buffaloes from 2010 to 2011.

On October 31 2022, The Fukuoka SoftBank Hawks announced that Kaneko will inauguration as coach from the 2023 season.

References

External links

NPB stats

1985 births
Living people
People from Kimitsu
Baseball people from Chiba Prefecture
Japanese baseball players
Nippon Professional Baseball infielders
Fukuoka Daiei Hawks players
Fukuoka SoftBank Hawks players
Orix Buffaloes players
Japanese baseball coaches
Nippon Professional Baseball coaches